Avenged may refer to:

 Avenged (1910 film), a 1910 silent film
 Avenged (2013 South African film), a 2013 South African film
 Avenged (2013 U.S. film), a 2013 American film

See also 
 Avenger (disambiguation)